Ichor is The Black League's first full-length album, released in 2000 by Spinefarm Records. A music video was made of the song "Winter Winds Sing". The limited 2LP version of Ichor includes two bonus tracks: "The Everlasting Pt. III" and "Pain Without A Name" of which the former was later re-recorded for the Doomsday Sun EP.

Track listing
"Doomwatcher" (Jarva et al.) - 2:17
"One Colour: Black" (Jarva et al.) - 4:59
"Deep Waters" (Jarva et al.) - 4:33
"Goin' to Hell" (Jarva et al.) - 4:08
"Avalon" (Jarva et al.) - 3:33
"We Die Alone" (Jarva, Florida et al.) - 4:20
"The Everlasting, Part II" (Florida, Jarva et al.) - 3:54
"Ozymandias" (Jarva et al.) - 3:26
"Blood of the Gods" (Jarva et al.) - 4:58
"Bunker King" (Luttinen, Jarva et al.) - 4:57
"Winter Winds Sing" (Jarva et al.) - 4:48
"Ecce Homo!" (Jarva et al.) - 3:45
"Night on Earth" (Jarva et al.) - 8:49

All lyrics by Taneli Jarva except Ozymandias by P.B. Shelley.

Musicians
Taneli Jarva — Vocals & additional instruments
Sir Luttinen — Drums, percussion & keyboards
Maike Valanne — Guitars
Alexi Ranta — Guitars
Florida — Bass guitar

References

2000 debut albums
The Black League albums